Robert or Rob Morgan may refer to:

Arts and entertainment
Robert W. Morgan (1937–1998), American disc jockey and Radio Hall of Famer
Robert C. Morgan (born 1943), American art critic, author, and artist
Robert Morgan (poet) (born 1944), American poet, short story writer and novelist
Robert Huw Morgan (born 1967), Welsh-born organist and choral conductor
Rob Morgan (actor) (born 1973), American actor
Robert Morgan (filmmaker) (born 1974), British filmmaker
Rob Morgan (singer) (fl. 1984–present), founder and lead vocalist of The Squirrels

Politics and law
Robert J. Morgan (1826–1899), American lawyer, planter and Confederate veteran
Robert Morgan (British politician) (1880–1960), British Conservative Party politician
Robert Dale Morgan (1912–2002), U.S. federal judge
Robert Burren Morgan (1925–2016), U.S. Senator from North Carolina
Robert Lewis Morgan (born 1952), American politician, member of the New Jersey General Assembly
Robert Nesta Morgan (born 1981), Jamaican politician

Others
Robert Morgan (bishop) (1608–1673), Welsh bishop of Bangor
Robert Clark Morgan (1798–1864), English sea captain
Robert K. Morgan (1918–2004), U.S. Air Force colonel and pilot, commander of Memphis Belle
Rob Morgan (racing driver) (born 1973), American racing driver

See also
Bob Morgan (disambiguation), for people named Bob or Bobby Morgan
Bert Morgan (disambiguation)
Robert Morgan Evans (1783–1844), Indiana politician
S. Robert Morgan, American television actor